Saint-Brice-Courcelles is a commune in the Marne department in north-eastern France. It is known for its architectural heritage and many castles.

Twinned with Robertsbridge East Sussex, England.

Population

See also
Communes of the Marne department

References

External links
 Patrimoine, Commune de Saint-Brice-Courcelles

Saintbricecourcelles